Olympiaki Radiofonia Tileorasi (abbreviated ORT) is a Greek local radio and television station serving the Elis regional unit. Its headquarters are in Pyrgos. Its former logo would depict three Olympic symbols, hence its name. It a broadcasts in Peloponnese, in southern Central Greece, in Aetolia, in Kythira, in Phocis, in Corinthian gulf, in islands of Argosaronic, in southern Ionian islands, in Boeotia and in western Attica.

Ownership
The same-named company operating the radio and television station was established on April 14, 1993. Its first headquarters are located on 28th October 54. On 1997, its statute was modified; a description of the channel's then-new logo was added. On March 23, 1998, the channel's operation was legalized under the 6616/Ε license, by the Ministry for the Press while at the same time moved its headquarters to Xanthou 2.

Its statute was modified again from 1998 by adding the purpose of producing programs and commercials, conducting cultural events and expanding online and other services. On December 11, 2003, its statute was modified again, by adding the purpose of founding and operating a radio station.

At the end of 2017, moved its headquarters to the fifth kiliometer of the Pyrgos-Patras national road where it remains until today. Leonidas Varouksis, the owner of the newspaper Patris, was the station's former president.

Programming
The channel's programming also includes telemarketing, children's shows, foreign films, and external productions, such as travel show Travel Guide with Thanos Papadimitriou, motorsport show Pano apo ta Oria with Stratos Foteinelis and the Kontra Channel show Epi tou Piestiriou. It's also been broadcasting programming from MAD TV.

The channel would formerly air programming from Channel 9, as part of the network POLIS Net, and Zoom TV.
Auto Sprint - show about automobiles, motorcycles and motorsport; presented by Stratos Photinelis.
Endikseis kai Apodikseis - news program; presented by Giorgos Fakos.
Anoixta Xartia - news program; presented by Giannis Argiropoulos, and later, by Panos Paulopoulos.
Olympiada Oli i Ellada - tribute to the 2004 Summer Olympics; produced by the Ministry of Culture and Sports and the Organizing Committee of the Olympic Games.
I Gi tis Ephorias - agricultural show; produced by the Ministry of Agriculture.
Exodos - entertainment show; presented by the channel's former executive, Periklis Patsouris.
Ora gia Spor - sports show; presented by Giorgos Asteris.
Cinepolis - show about the cinema.

See also
List of Greek-language television channels

References

External links
Official website
ORT FM 92,3

Elis
Radio stations in Greece
Television channels in Greece
Mass media in Pyrgos, Elis
Television channels and stations established in 1993